Allahabad Bank was an Indian nationalised bank with its headquarters in Kolkata, India. Founded in Allahabad in 1865 and nationalized by the government of India in 1969, the bank provided banking and financial services for 155 years until it was merged with Indian Bank in 2020. 

, Allahabad Bank had over 3245 branches across India. The bank did a total business of 3.8 trillion during the FY 2017–18. The bank's market capitalisation  was US$573 million and ranked #1,882 on the Forbes Global 2000 list.

19th century

On 24 April 1865,  founded Allahabad Bank in Allahabad. By the end of the 19th century it had branches at Jhansi, Kanpur, Lucknow, Bareilly, Nainital, Calcutta, and Delhi.

20th century
In the early 20th century, with the start of Swadeshi movement, Allahabad Bank witnessed a spurt in deposits. In 1923 the bank moved its head office and the registered office to Calcutta for reasons of both operational convenience and business opportunities. Then in 1927 Chartered Bank of India, Australia and China (Chartered Bank) acquired P&O Bank. However, Chartered Bank continued to operate Allahabad Bank as a separate entity.

Allahabad Bank opened a branch in Rangoon (Yangon). At some point, Chartered Bank amalgamated Allahabad Bank's branch in Rangoon with its own. In 1963 the revolutionary government in Burma nationalized the Chartered Bank's operations there, which became People's Bank No. 2.

On 19 July 1969, the Indian government nationalised Allahabad Bank, along with 13 other banks.

In October 1989, Allahabad Bank acquired United Industrial Bank, a Calcutta-based bank that had been established in 1940 and that brought with it 145 branches. Two years later, Allahabad Bank established AllBank Finance Ltd, a wholly owned merchant banking subsidiary.

21st century
Its older logo, a monogram consisting of "A" and "B", was replaced by the current 'Triveni Sangam' logo circa 1997.

The IPO reduced the Government's shareholding to 71.16%. Then in April 2005 the bank conducted a second public offering of 100 million of shares, each with a face value 10 and selling at a premium of 72. This offering reduced the Government's ownership to 55.23%.

In June 2006, the bank opened its first office outside India when it opened a representative office in Shenzhen, Mainland China. In February 2007, Allahabad Bank opened its first overseas branch, in Hong Kong. In March, the bank's business crossed the 10 million mark.

On 30 August 2019, Finance Minister Nirmala Sitharaman announced that Allahabad Bank would merge with Indian Bank. The Union Cabinet approved the merger on 4 March 2020. Indian Bank assumed control of Allahabad Bank on 1 April 2020.

Listings and shareholding
Allahabad Bank's equity shares are listed on Bombay Stock Exchange and the National Stock Exchange of India.

Employees
, the bank had 22,557 employees, out of which 3,293 were women (15%). Out of the total employees, 51% were officers, 30% were clerks and remaining 19% were subordinate staff. The bank recruited 1,950 employees (1,421 Officers, 390 Clerks and 139 subordinate staff) during the same financial year. The company incurred 20 billion on employee benefit expenses during the same financial year. During the FY 2013–14, the business per employee was 13.50 million and it earned a net profit of 0.477 million per employee.

The bank was operating in the following states/UTs.

 Andaman And Nicobar Island
 Andhra Pradesh
 Arunachal Pradesh
 Assam
 Bihar
 Chandigarh
 Chhattisgarh
 Delhi
 Goa
 Gujarat
 Haryana
 Himachal Pradesh
 Jammu And Kashmir
 Jharkhand
 Karnataka
 Kerala
 Madhya Pradesh
 Maharashtra
 Manipur
 Meghalaya
 Nagaland
 Odisha
 Puducherry
 Punjab
 Rajasthan
 Sikkim
 Tamil Nadu
 Telangana
 Tripura
 Uttar Pradesh
 Uttarakhand
 West Bengal

Scams 
On 13 July 2019, Allahabad Bank disclosed that it detected a fraud, worth  by Bhushan Power & Steel (BPSL).

See also

List of banks in India
Chartered Bank of India, Australia and China

References

External links

  Official website

Defunct banks of India
Indian companies established in 1865
Banks established in 1865
Banks disestablished in 2020
Companies formerly listed on the Bombay Stock Exchange
Companies nationalised by the Government of India
Banks based in Kolkata
Indian companies disestablished in 2020
Economic history of Uttar Pradesh
Companies listed on the National Stock Exchange of India
Companies listed on the Bombay Stock Exchange